Spier is a surname. Notable people with the surname include:

Bernd Spier (1944–2017), German schlager singer and record producer
Guy Spier (born 1966), South African/German/Israeli Swiss-based investor and author 
Jo Spier (1900–1978), Dutch artist and illustrator
Peter Spier (1927–2017), Dutch-born American illustrator and writer
Virgil Spier (born 1981), Dutch athlete 
William Spier (1906–1973), American writer, producer, and director for television and radio